The Weldon Spring Conservation Area, is a  conservation area that is owned and managed by the Missouri Department of Conservation and located in St. Charles County, Missouri. The area borders the Missouri River, and the Katy Trail runs through the area but is not considered part of the conservation area.

History 
The area was named for John Weldon, who immigrated to the area in 1796 and acquired a  Spanish Land Grant. Portions of the Conservation Area were used by the Weldon Spring Ordnance Works, and old bunkers formerly used for the storage of TNT still dot the area. The area is part of a superfund site, and has been decontaminated. TNT and uranium processing were done on this site.

All of the land except the munitions plant was given to the University of Missouri in 1948 for use as an agricultural experiment station. The Department of Conservation originally purchased  from the University of Missouri to establish the conservation area in 1978.

Geography 
The area has numerous limestone cliffs overlooking the Missouri River. The floods of 1993 and 1995 deposited sand on almost  of agricultural fields, which now provides valuable wildlife habitat.

Recreation 
The area provides a wide variety of recreational activities.

Hunting and fishing 
There are several small lakes and streams as well as the Missouri river that provide fishing opportunities in the conservation area. Hunting is permitted during special managed hunts as long as regulations are followed.

Hiking and biking 
This does not include the Katy Trail, which is part of the state park system. Two of the trails, the Lewis and Clark trails, are open to hiking only, while the Lost Valley and Hamburg trails are open to both hiking and biking.

Lewis Trail -  - hiking only
Clark Trail -  - hiking only
Lost Valley Trail -  - multi-use
Hamburg Trail -  - multi-use

References 

Protected areas of St. Charles County, Missouri
Nuclear weapons infrastructure of the United States
Military Superfund sites
Conservation Areas of Missouri
Protected areas established in 1978
1978 establishments in Missouri